Gerrit Plomp (born 27 June 1963) is a retired Dutch football defender.

Honours
FC Utrecht
 KNVB Cup: 1984–85

References

External links
 

1963 births
Living people
Dutch footballers
Netherlands under-21 international footballers
Eredivisie players
Bundesliga players
FC Utrecht players
VfL Bochum players
Feyenoord players
Fortuna Sittard players
Dutch expatriate footballers
Expatriate footballers in Germany
Footballers from Utrecht (city)
Association football defenders
Association football sweepers